Wang Weiyi (born 4 February 1967) is a Chinese biathlete. He competed in the men's 20 km individual event at the 1992 Winter Olympics.

References

1967 births
Living people
Chinese male biathletes
Olympic biathletes of China
Biathletes at the 1992 Winter Olympics
Place of birth missing (living people)
Asian Games medalists in biathlon
Biathletes at the 1990 Asian Winter Games
Asian Games gold medalists for China
Asian Games silver medalists for China
Asian Games bronze medalists for China
Medalists at the 1990 Asian Winter Games